Black Market Music may refer to:

 Black Market Music (album), a 2000 album by Placebo
 Black Market Music (record label), an Australian blues and roots-music label

See also 
 Black Market (disambiguation)